Callirhytis is a genus of gall wasps in the family Cynipidae. There are more than 90 described species in Callirhytis.

Species
The following species are recognised in the genus Callirhytis:

 Callirhytis afion Melika et al., 2020
 Callirhytis apicalis (Ashmead, 1896)
 Callirhytis aquaticae (Ashmead, 1887)
 Callirhytis attigua Weld, 1959
 Callirhytis balanacea Weld, 1928
 Callirhytis balanaspis Weld, 1922
 Callirhytis balanoides Weld, 1922
 Callirhytis balanopsis Weld, 1922
 Callirhytis balanosa Weld, 1922
 Callirhytis bipapillata Weld, 1959
 Callirhytis blastophaga (Ashmead, 1887)
 Callirhytis cameroni Medianero & Nieves-Aldrey, 2014
 Callirhytis carmelensis Weld, 1922
 Callirhytis cedros Dailey & Sprenger, 1977
 Callirhytis cedrosensis Dailey & Sprenger, 1977
 Callirhytis cistella Weld, 1952
 Callirhytis clarkei (Bassett, 1890)
 Callirhytis clavula (Osten Sacken, 1861) - White oak club gall wasp
 Callirhytis confusa (Ashmead, 1881)
 Callirhytis congregata (Ashmead, 1896) - Sausage flower gall wasp
 Callirhytis cressoni (Beutenmuller, 1913)
 Callirhytis crypta (Ashmead, 1887)
 Callirhytis eldoradensis (Beutenmuller 1913)
 Callirhytis electrea Weld, 1944
 Callirhytis ellipsoida Weld, 1921
 Callirhytis elliptica Weld, 1921
 Callirhytis elongata {Kinsey, 1922)
 Callirhytis erythrocephala (Giraud, 1859)
 Callirhytis excavata (Ashmead, 1896)
 Callirhytis exigua (Bassett, 1900)
 Callirhytis favosa (Bassett, 1890) - Honeycomb leaf gall wasp
 Callirhytis flavipes (Gillette, 1890)
 Callirhytis florensis Weld, 1944
 Callirhytis floridana (Ashmead, 1887)
 Callirhytis floripara Weld, 1959
 Callirhytis frequens (Gillette, 1890)
 Callirhytis fulva Weld, 1921
 Callirhytis furva Weld, 1952
 Callirhytis gallaestriatae Weld, 1927
 Callirhytis gemmiformis (Beutenmüller, 1917)
 Callirhytis glandium (Giraud, 1859)
 Callirhytis glandulus (Beutenmüller, 1913)
 Callirhytis glomerosa Weld, 1957
 Callirhytis hartigi Forster, 1869
 Callirhytis hopkinsi Weld, 1952
 Callirhytis infuscata (Ashmead, 1887)
 Callirhytis intersita Weld, 1957
 Callirhytis juvenca Weld, 1944
 Callirhytis lanata (Gillette, 1891)
 Callirhytis lapillula Weld, 1922
 Callirhytis lentiformis Lyon, 1984
 Callirhytis marginata Weld, 1921
 Callirhytis medularis Weld, 1959
 Callirhytis meunieri Kieffer, 1902
 Callirhytis middletoni Weld, 1959
 Callirhytis myrtifoliae (Beutenmüller, 1917)
 Callirhytis nigrae (Ashmead, 1861)
 Callirhytis ovata Weld, 1921
 Callirhytis parva Weld, 1922
 Callirhytis pedunculata (Bassett, 1890)
 Callirhytis perdens {Kinsey, 1922) - Ruptured twig gall wasp
 Callirhytis perditor (Bassett, 1900)
 Callirhytis perfoveata {Kinsey, 1922) - Ball gall wasp
 Callirhytis perobscura Weld, 1957
 Callirhytis perrugosa Weld, 1944
 Callirhytis petrina Weld, 1922
 Callirhytis pigra (Bassett, 1881)
 Callirhytis piperoides (Bassett, 1900)
 Callirhytis protobalanus Dailey & Sprenger, 1977
 Callirhytis pulchra (Bassett, 1890) - Oak flower gall wasp
 Callirhytis quercifoliae (Ashmead, 1885) 
 Callirhytis quercusagrifoliae (Ashmead, 1881) - Live oak bud gall wasp
 Callirhytis quercusbatatoides (Ashmead, 1881) - Southern live oak stem gall wasp
 Callirhytis quercusclavigera (Ashmead, 1881) 
 Callirhytis quercuscornigera (Osten Sacken, 1865) 
 Callirhytis quercusfutilis (Osten Sacken, 1861) 
 Callirhytis quercusgemmaria (Ashmead, 1885) 
 Callirhytis quercusoperator (Osten Sacken, 1862) - Woolly catkin gall wasp
 Callirhytis quercuspunctata (Bassett, 1863) - Gouty oak gall wasp
 Callirhytis quercussuttoni (Ashmead, 1885) - Gouty stem gall wasp
 Callirhytis quercusventricosa Bassett, 1864
 Callirhytis quinqueseptum (Ashmead, 1885)
 Callirhytis rubida Weld, 1921
 Callirhytis rufescens (Mayr, 1882)
 Callirhytis rugulosa (Beutenmüller, 1911)
 Callirhytis scitula (Bassett, 1864)
 Callirhytis seminator Harris, 1841 - Wool sower
 Callirhytis seminosa (Bassett, 1890)
 Callirhytis serricornis (Weld, 1952) - Kernel flower gall wasp
 Callirhytis subcostata Weld, 1952
 Callirhytis tobiiro Ashmead, 1904
 Callirhytis tubicola (Osten Sacken, 1861)
 Callirhytis turnerii (Ashmead, 1887)

References

Further reading

 
 
 

Cynipidae
Hymenoptera genera
Gall-inducing insects